There are around 1821 notable large dams in state of Maharashtra in India.

Dams in Maharashtra by specification
The table below list dams of state of Maharashtra by their specifications which has gross storage capacity more than 10,000 103m3.

See also
 [Famine in India]

References

Notes
 Sakhare, V.B.2005. "Reservoir fisheries of Maharashtra." Fishing Chimes. 23(7):34-37
 Sakhare, V.B.2007. Reservoir Fisheries and Limnology, Narendra Publishing House, Delhi
 Sakhare, V.B.2007. Applied Fisheries. Daya Publishing House, Delhi
Kalammawadi dam at kolhapurtourism
Kalammawadi dam at industryabout
Mapping, locations, statistical data; diversion of flow from east to west, reservoirs on different scales from Nathsagar to tanks system of Bhandara, Pazar talav, seasonal flow patterns and as they are modified by bunding and lifting of water

Dams
Maharashtra
Dams